Nash is an outdoor 1978–1979 sculpture by Lee Kelly, installed in southeast Portland, Oregon, United States.

Description
Lee Kelly's Nash is a stainless steel sculpture installed at 1019 Southeast 10th Avenue in Portland's Buckman neighborhood. The abstract, geometric work measures approximately  x  x . It includes an inscription with the text "" and the artist's monogram, which joins the letters "L" and "K". The sculpture is administered by the National Builders Hardware Company. It was surveyed and considered "well maintained" by the Smithsonian Institution's "Save Outdoor Sculpture!" program in November 1993.

See also

 1979 in art

References

1979 establishments in Oregon
1979 sculptures
Abstract sculptures in Oregon
Buckman, Portland, Oregon
Outdoor sculptures in Portland, Oregon
Sculptures by Lee Kelly
Southeast Portland, Oregon
Stainless steel sculptures in Oregon